

People
Blagoev or Blagoyev is a Bulgarian male surname meaning "son of Blagoy", its feminine counterpart is Blagoeva or Blagoyeva. It may refer to
Blagoy Blagoev (born 1956), Bulgarian weightlifter 
Boris Blagoev (born 1985), Bulgarian football player
Dimitar Blagoev (1856–1924), Bulgarian politician
Maya Blagoeva (born 1956), Bulgarian Olympic gymnast
Silvana Blagoeva (born 1972), Bulgarian Olympic biathlon competitor
Yordanka Blagoeva (born 1947), Bulgarian high jumper

See also
Blagojević, Montenegrin and Serbian equivalent

Ships
Blagoev, a Soviet steamer sunk by submarine in the course of the Spanish Civil War in 1937

Bulgarian-language surnames
Patronymic surnames